Si Thoi, Chiang Rai is a tambon (sub-district) of Mae Suai District, in Chiang Rai Province, Thailand. In 2014 it had a population of 6,282 people.

Administration

Central administration
The tambon is divided into 12 administrative villages (mubans).

Local administration
The area of the sub-district is covered by the sub-district administrative organization (SAO) Si Thoi (องค์การบริหารส่วนตำบลศรีถ้อย)

References

External links

Thaitambon.com on Si Thoi

Tambon of Chiang Rai province
Populated places in Chiang Rai province